"Avalon" is a 1982 song by the English rock band Roxy Music. It was released as the second single from their eighth and final studio album Avalon (1982). The single, with its B-side, "Always Unknowing", charted at No. 13 in the UK.

Recording
The song's distinctive backing vocals were performed by Haitian singer Yanick Étienne, whom Bryan Ferry encountered during the recording of the album. He heard her in the adjacent studio and invited her to contribute backing vocals to the recording.

Promotional video
The song's music video was directed by Ridley Scott and features the English actress Sophie Ward, daughter of actor Simon Ward. It was filmed in Mentmore Towers country house.

M People cover
In 1997 British House dance group M People covered the song and released it as the twelfth and closing track on their final and latest to date studio album, Fresco.

Personnel
 Bryan Ferry – lead vocals, keyboards
 Andy Mackay – saxophone
 Phil Manzanera – guitar
 Neil Hubbard – guitar
 Alan Spenner – bass guitar
 Andy Newmark – drums
 Jimmy Maelen – percussion
 Fonzi Thornton – backing vocals
 Yanick Étienne – backing vocals

Charts

Weekly charts

Year-end charts

Certifications

References

External links
 

1982 singles
1982 songs
Roxy Music songs
Songs written by Bryan Ferry
Warner Records singles
Reprise Records singles
E.G. Records singles